Carl-Uwe Steeb was the defending champion but did not compete that year.

Goran Ivanišević won in the final 3–6, 6–1, 6–3 against Yevgeny Kafelnikov.

Seeds

  Yevgeny Kafelnikov (final)
  Goran Ivanišević (champion)
  Jim Courier (second round)
  Cédric Pioline (first round)
  Àlex Corretja (first round)
  MaliVai Washington (second round)
  Marc Rosset (second round)
  Carlos Moyá (second round)

Draw

Finals

Top half

Bottom half

References
 Draw

Kremlin Cup
1996 ATP Tour